Denys Oleksandrovych Svityukha (born 8 February 2002) is a Ukrainian professional footballer who plays as a striker for Lleida Esportiu on loan from Shakhtar Donetsk.

Career
Born in Marinka Raion, Donetsk Oblast, Svityukha is a product of Shakhtar Donetsk academy.

He played in the Ukrainian Premier League Reserves and never made his debut for the senior squad of Shakhtar Donetsk. In July 2021 Svitukha signed a one-year loan contract with Mariupol and made his debut in the Ukrainian Premier League as a substitute player in the losing home match against Zorya Luhansk on 22 August 2021.

References

External links
 
 

2002 births
Living people
Ukrainian footballers
Association football forwards
FC Shakhtar Donetsk players
FC Mariupol players
Lleida Esportiu footballers
Ukrainian Premier League players
Segunda Federación players
Ukrainian expatriate footballers
Expatriate footballers in Spain
Ukrainian expatriate sportspeople in Spain
Sportspeople from Donetsk Oblast